Closeburn railway station was a railway station in Dumfries and Galloway north of Dumfries, serving a rural community with Wallace Hall Academy and Closeburn Castle nearby. Its OS NGR is NX 8970 9234.

History 
The station opened on 15 October 1849. The station is now closed, although the line running through the station is still open. The station buildings, goods sheds and station master's house still exist, but the platforms have been removed.

Lost and found
The 1897 - 1956 Found Items book from Closeburn has survived and is held in the Ewart Library in Dumfries. As per usual in Scotland items of waterproof clothing and umbrellas figure prominently in the list of recovered items.

References 
Notes;

Sources;

 
 
 

Railway stations in Great Britain opened in 1849
Railway stations in Great Britain closed in 1961
Disused railway stations in Dumfries and Galloway
1849 establishments in Scotland
Former Glasgow and South Western Railway stations
1961 disestablishments in Scotland